North Lincolnshire Council is the local authority for the unitary authority of North Lincolnshire in Lincolnshire, England. It was created on 1 April 1996 replacing Glanford, Scunthorpe, part of Boothferry and Humberside County Council.

Political control
The first election to the council was held in 1995, initially operating as a shadow authority before coming into its powers on 1 April 1996. Political control of the council since 1995 has been held by the following parties:

Leadership
The leaders of the council since 2006 have been:

Council elections
1995 North Lincolnshire Council election
1999 North Lincolnshire Council election
2003 North Lincolnshire Council election (New ward boundaries)
2007 North Lincolnshire Council election
2011 North Lincolnshire Council election
2015 North Lincolnshire Council election
2019 North Lincolnshire Council election

District result maps

By-election results

References

External links
North Lincolnshire Council

 
Council elections in Lincolnshire
Unitary authority elections in England